Varun Aditya (Tamil Language:வரூன் ஆதித்யா born January 19, 1991) is an Indian wildlife photographer and an environmentalist. He has also received accolades for his photographs, notably claiming first prize as the National Geographic Nature Photographer of the Year 2016.

He has also been doing research about animals and nature by taking photographs of them.

Career 

He received the opportunity to travel with American popular landscape photographer Michael Melford to Costa Rica and Panama after winning a Nat Geo competition in 2013. In 2016, he won the first prize at the National Geographic Photographer of the Year in the Animal Portraits category for his photograph on a green vine snake which is also called the Asian Vine Snake.

On 19 August 2019 coinciding with the World Photography Day, CEO of Apple, Tim Cook took to Twitter and shared an image which was captured by Varun Aditya related to the picture on elephants with double rainbow in the background.

Awards and recognition
2016:
 The National Geographic Nature Photographer of the Year award in 2016

References 

Living people
Indian photographers
Indian wildlife photographers
Indian portrait photographers
People from Coimbatore district
Artists from Tamil Nadu
21st-century Indian photographers
Indian environmentalists
Photographers from Tamil Nadu
1991 births